Lambert Lawrence Hehl, Jr. (July 22, 1924 - September 23, 2019) was an American politician in the state of Kentucky. He served in the Kentucky Senate as a Democrat from 1959 to 1963. He is also a former judge-executive of Campbell County, Kentucky.

References

1924 births
2019 deaths
Democratic Party Kentucky state senators